The Punisher (also known as The Punisher: Welcome Back, Frank) is a 12-issue comic book limited series written by Garth Ennis with art by Steve Dillon and Jimmy Palmiotti which was published under the Marvel Knights imprint of Marvel Comics. The series features the vigilante anti-hero the Punisher and ran from April 2000 to March 2001.

Publication history

The series is regarded as the fifth volume of the Punisher title. The story continued in Ennis' 2001 The Punisher ongoing series.

Prints

Issues

 Welcome Back, Frank
 Badaboom, Badabing
 The Devil by the Horns
 Wild Kingdom
 Even Worse Things
 Spit Out of Luck
 Bring Out your Dead
 Desperate Measures
 From Russia with Love
 Glutton for Punishment
 Any which Way you Can
 Go Frank Go

Plot
Frank, still depicted as a Vietnam War veteran, reestablishes himself in New York City by taking on the Gnucci crime syndicate. Detective Soap is assigned to "catch" the Punisher; it is purely a P.R. move as the police do not really want Frank caught as they secretly condone his actions. Frank turns the hapless Soap to his side, getting him to pass information on local crime syndicates.

Against his will, Frank gains three loyal friends in his neighbors, Joan the Mouse, Mr. Bumpo, and Spacker Dave. All end up helping him in his crusade against the Gnuccis. Some of this is self-defense as the Gnuccis learn where Frank lives and stage an attack. Spacker himself suffers torture at the hands of the Gnuccis, his piercings ripped out in a fruitless attempt to gain intelligence on Frank.

The Gnucci operation is slowly dismantled. Soap is promoted to police commissioner. As a gesture of thanks for aiding him, Frank gives his neighbors a large sum of Gnucci money. Joan and Spacker would play larger roles in Frank's life later. Bumpo suffers a medical accident ("something important fell out of his bottom") and moves into a hospital.

Collected editions
The series was collected in a trade paperback, along with Punisher Kills the Marvel Universe, as The Punisher: Welcome Back, Frank (Marvel, hardcover, ; softcover, ; Panini, softcover), which became the informal series title.

The series was also collected as Marvel Knights Punisher by Garth Ennis: The Complete Collection Vol. 1 .

In other media
Joan, Mr. Bumpo, and Spacker Dave were all portrayed in the 2004 movie The Punisher.
Another version of the story runs through the 2005 Punisher video game.

External links

Comics by Garth Ennis
Comics set in New York City
Defunct American comics